Sylvestre can refer to:

People

Surname

Given name

Middle name 
 Carlos Sylvestre Begnis (1903–1980), Argentine medical doctor and politician
 Philippe Sylvestre Dufour (1622–1687), French Protestant apothecary, banker, collector, and author
 Jean-Pierre Sylvestre de Grateloup (1782–1862), French physician and naturalist
 Marie Nicolas Sylvestre Guillon (1760–1847), French ecclesiastic
 Étienne Pierre Sylvestre Ricard (1771–1843), French military commander
 Jean François Sylvestre Denis de Trobriand (1765–1799), French naval officer and navigator

Plants
 Cichorium sylvestre, a synonym of Cichorium intybus, common chicory
 Galium sylvestre, a synonym for Galium album, a plant species native to Europe
 Gymnema sylvestre, a perennial woody vine native to Asia
 Hypocalymma sylvestre, a member of the family Myrtaceae, endemic to Western Australia
 Metroxylon sylvestre, a synonym for Metroxylon sagu, a species of palm native to tropical southeastern Asia
 Prasophyllum sylvestre, a species of orchid  endemic to south-eastern Australia, commonly known as the forest leek orchid
 Ribes sylvestre, a synonym of Ribes rubrum, redcurrant
 Syzygium sylvestre, a plant species endemic to Sri Lanka, also known as Syzygium makul

See also
 
 Saint-Sylvestre (disambiguation)
  Silvestre (disambiguation)
 Sylvester (disambiguation)
 Sylvestris (disambiguation)